Lay It On The Line are a British melodic hardcore band from London. They were formed in 2012 by Phinius Gage member Mike Scott, his brother Matt and Dave Smith, who was originally guitarist in Not Katies. They wrote their demo in a single evening and recorded it in a single day. Championed by Radio 1 DJ Mike Davies before they had played a show, the band have so far gone on to release four EPs and, featuring a new line-up, their debut album The Black Museum, was released on Disconnect, Disconnect Records on 30 June 2017. Their current line-up also features Donuts on bass, who is formerly of Hang The Bastard. As of 2018, they were in the studio recording their second album.

Discography

References

External links
 Lay It on the Line Website
 Lay It on the Line Bandcamp
 Interview with Mike on The Process
 Review of 'The Black Museum' by Musically Fresh zine
 Mike from the band on The Process Church of the Final Judgment

Melodic hardcore groups
British hardcore punk groups
Musical groups from London
2012 establishments in England
Musical groups established in 2012
Musical quartets